Number 55 is a 2014 Croatian war film directed by Kristijan Milić, billed as "the first action movie" about the 1991–95 Croatian War of Independence.

The film won eight Golden Arenas, including the Big Golden Arena for Best Film. The cast also includes Luka Peroš best known for his role of Marseille in Money Heist.

Plot
Movie takes place during the Independence War in Croatia. The film is based on a true story that happened on the eve in autumn of 1991 in the small Croatian village of Kusonje, near Pakrac. A small group of Croatian soldiers went on a patrol in an improvised armored car that they had made. In Kusonje, they get ambushed by Serb forces and are forced to hide in a nearby abandoned house that bears the house number 55. Their resistance to the rebeling forces, the JNA and Serbian special forces takes almost 24 hours. In parallel, the film follows the efforts of their fellow soldiers to pull them out of the encirclement.

References

External links 

2010s war films
Yugoslav Wars films
War films based on actual events
Croatian war films
Films set in 1991
Works about the Croatian War of Independence